Jerónimo de Alcalá Yáñez y Rivera (1571, Murcia – 1632, Segovia) was a Spanish physician and writer.  Most of his works were published after 1615.

1571 births
1632 deaths
17th-century Spanish writers
Murcian writers
People from Murcia